Antaeus is a men's perfume produced by French fashion house Chanel. Introduced in 1981, it was created by perfumer Jacques Polge.   It was Chanel's second male fragrance after Chanel pour Monsieur, which was introduced in 1963. 
The fragrance was named after the mythic giant Antaeus.

References

External links
 Antaeus at Basenotes
Perfumes
Products introduced in 1981
Designer perfumes